Clarence Page (born June 2, 1947) is an American journalist, syndicated columnist, and senior member of the Chicago Tribune editorial board.

Early years
Page was born in Dayton, Ohio, and attended Middletown High School in Middletown where he worked on the school's bi-weekly newspaper. After graduating in 1965, he worked freelance as a writer and photographer for The Middletown Journal and The Cincinnati Enquirer, while he earned his Bachelor of Science degree in journalism from Ohio University.

Career
After his graduation from university in 1969, Page took a position with The Chicago Tribune, and was drafted into the military after only six months with the paper. He found himself assigned as an Army journalist with the 212th Artillery Group at Fort Lewis, Washington, when his obligation ended and he made his way back to the Tribune in 1971.

Page is a frequent panelist on The McLaughlin Group (on hiatus as of January, 2021), a regular contributor of essays to The PBS NewsHour, host of several documentaries on the Public Broadcasting Service, and an occasional commentator on National Public Radio's Weekend Edition Sunday. Page often appears as a political analyst on the Hardball with Chris Matthews  on MSNBC. He also appeared in the 1993 film Rising Sun, playing himself as a talk show panel member. Page's achievements came despite an undiagnosed case of ADD, the effects of which he recounts in a chapter in Positively ADD.

Clarence Page wrote an editorial piece about "Richie" Daley and his achievements as mayor of Chicago.

Personal life
Page was married to and later divorced from Leanita McClain, a Tribune columnist who also focused on race. In 1987 Page married Lisa Johnson with whom he has one son, Grady Jonathan.

Honors and awards
Page has received honoris causa doctorates from Columbia College Chicago, Lake Forest College, and Nazareth College in Rochester, New York.
 1989 Pulitzer Prize for Commentary
 1987 American Civil Liberties Union James P. McGuire Award for columns on constitutional rights
 1980 Illinois UPI Award for community service for The Black Tax
 1976 Edward Scott Beck Award for overseas reporting on the changing politics of Southern Africa
 1972 Pulitzer Prize for a Chicago Tribune Task Force series on voter fraud

Bibliography

References

External links
 Clarence Page's columns in the Chicago Tribune includes archive and biography
 
 
 
 The Online NewsHour, Clarence Page Essays

1947 births
Living people
African-American journalists
African-American television personalities
African-American writers
American columnists
American essayists
Chicago Tribune people
Ohio University alumni
Writers from Dayton, Ohio
People from Montgomery County, Maryland
Pulitzer Prize for Commentary winners
Writers from Chicago
Journalists from Ohio
21st-century African-American people
20th-century African-American people